Nazmakan may refer to:
 Nazmakan-e Olya
 Nazmakan-e Sofla